Crown Prince Dongryun (동륜태자; ? – 572) was the eldest son of Jinheung of Silla and Queen Sado. He is the father of Jinpyeong of Silla.

In 566, he was appointed as the Crown Prince, but died in 572, before he could to ascend the throne. His younger brother, Saryun (사륜) became King Jinji. After his Jinji's abidication, Dongryun's eldest son became King Jinpyeong of Silla.

According to Hwarang Segi, he secretly fell in love with Lady Mishil, his father's concubine.

Family 
Parents

 Father Jinheung of Silla
 Grandfather: Galmunwang Ipjong (입종 갈문왕)
 Grandmother: Queen Jiso (지소태후) (? – 574)
 Mother: Queen Sado of the Park clan (사도왕후 박씨) (? – February 614)
 Grandfather: Park Yeong-sil (박영실, 朴英失), Lord Gi-oh (기오공)
 Grandmother: Princess Okjin of the Gyeongju Kim clan (옥진궁주 김씨)
 Consorts and issues:
 Queen Manho, of the Kim clan (만호부인 김씨; d.579), daughter of Galmunwang Ipjong
 Kim Baek-Jeong, Jinpyeong of Silla (567 – 632)
 Kim Baekban (김백반), Galmunwang Jinjeong (진정 갈문왕)
 Kim Gukban (김국반), Galmunwang Jin-an (진안 갈문왕)
 Lady Mishil (미실)
 Princess Aesong (艾松公主, 애송공주)
 Queen Yungun, of the Kim clan (윤궁부인 김씨), daughter of the 8th Pungwolju
 Princess Yunsil (윤실궁주)

Reference 

Korean Buddhist monarchs
Silla Buddhist monks
Year of birth unknown
572 deaths
6th-century Korean people

Year of birth missing